Trapper's Bay State Park is located on the west side of Lake Park, Iowa, United States. The  park is along the north shore of Silver Lake.  It provides space for picnicking, including a shelter listed on the National Register of Historic Places, and boating and fishing on the lake.

History
Property for Trapper's Bay was acquired by the state in 1933. Civilian Conservation Corps Company 778 began park development sometime between the beginning of June and the end of October 1933 as part of their work with the National Forest Service. Work on the picnic shelter and the latrines was begun in 1933 and completed by March 1934 after they were transferred to the National Park Service. The park was put under the jurisdiction of Gull Point State Park in 1936.

Picnic Shelter
The Rustic style structure features back and side walls composed of random rubble stone. On the center of the back wall is a stone fireplace and chimney. Two round timber posts with bracing hold up the timber gable roof. Exposed purlins extend below the overhang of the roof. Located on a small point of land near the lake, the significance of its architecture is that it was designed to blend into its natural surroundings by means of its material, design, and workmanship.

References

Protected areas established in 1933
Civilian Conservation Corps in Iowa
Rustic architecture in Iowa
Protected areas of Dickinson County, Iowa
Buildings and structures in Dickinson County, Iowa
National Register of Historic Places in Dickinson County, Iowa
State parks of Iowa
Park buildings and structures on the National Register of Historic Places in Iowa
1933 establishments in Iowa